Peter Creagh or Piers Crevens (born Carrigeen 25 July 1642; died Strasbourg 25 July 1705) was  an Irish Roman Catholic bishop in the late 17th and early 18th centuries.

Life
Creagh was educated at the Jesuit college in Poitiers and in 1660 went on to the Pontifical Irish College in Rome, where was awarded a doctorate. He was ordained priest in February 1666, served on the mission in Ireland for three years, and then became the agent of the Irish bishops in Rome. He spoke Italian, Latin, French, English, and Irish. In 1671 Oliver Plunkett described him as of average height with a long oval face and reddish brown hair and beard.

Creagh was consecrated Bishop of Cork and Cloyne on 27 May 1676 at the church of St Isidore in Rome. During the Popish Plot scare orchestrated by Titus Oates he was arrested in March 1680 and spent two years in prison on suspicion of conspiring to murder Charles II of England, before being acquitted in August 1682. During the trial the courthouse roof collapsed on his accusers, narrowly missing the judge, but leaving Creagh unscathed.

He left Ireland after the defeat of James II of England in 1690. In 1693 he was translated to the Archbishopric of Dublin on the recommendation of King James, but he was never able to return to Ireland to claim the see. He became Coadjutor Bishop of Strasbourg, where he died on 25 July 1705.

Notes

John Sleyne

1642 births
1705 deaths
Clergy from County Limerick
17th-century Roman Catholic bishops in Ireland
17th-century Roman Catholic archbishops in Ireland
18th-century Roman Catholic archbishops in Ireland
Irish Jacobites
Roman Catholic archbishops of Dublin
Roman Catholic bishops of Cork and Cloyne